The Revolutionary Communist Youth (abbr. ) of Norway is the youth wing of Serve the People. The party was formed by a split within Red Youth, the youth affiliate of Red.

References

External links 
 

Youth wings of communist parties
Youth wings of political parties in Norway
2008 establishments in Norway
Organizations established in 2008
Communist organisations in Norway
Maoist organizations in Europe